Clalit, (General Health Services; previously – , General Sick Fund), is the largest of Israel's four state-mandated health service organizations, charged with administering health care services and funding for its members. (All Israeli citizens resident in the country must be a member of one of the four providers.)

Widely known as Kupat Holim Clalit, it was established in 1911 as a mutual aid society.  When the State of Israel was founded in 1948, Clalit was instrumental in providing medical care for the massive influx of new immigrants. Today, it is the largest provider of public and semi-private health services in Israel. Under Israeli law, it is run as a not-for-profit entity.

History
The foundations for Kupat Holim Clalit were laid by the Judea Workers' Health Fund, established at a convention of the Federation of Workers in Judea in December 1911.

Historically, Clalit was affiliated with the Histadrut labor movement. To be a member of Clalit, one had to join the Histadrut. The name "Clalit" means "general" in Hebrew and derives from the Histadrut's full name – HaHistadrut HaKlalit shel HaOvdim B'Eretz Yisrael (lit. "The General Federation of Laborers in the Land of Israel"). In January 1995, Israel's national health insurance law went into effect, creating a compulsory health care system based on four service providers: Clalit, Leumit, Maccabi, and Meuhedet. Clalit is the largest of the four health funds with around 4.6 million insured members, representing slightly over half of the Israeli population in 2020. Since the 1995 law went into effect, membership has been open to all citizens and its tie to the Histadrut has been severed.

Services
Clalit runs its own network of hospitals in Israel (although it provides services, especially emergency care, for members of the other national health funds as well). It operates 14 hospitals, including psychiatric hospitals and a rehabilitation hospital, all of them university-affiliated. Clalit runs over 1,300 primary care clinics as well as a network of pharmacies and dental clinics.

It was an early adopter of Health information technology with substantial investment in Electronic health records.  In 2015 nearly 60% of its pediatric consultations took place over smartphones.

Hospitals
Soroka Medical Center (founded in 1960) in Beersheba. The largest hospital in the Clalit network, serves over half the area of the State of Israel, and a population of 1 million. Soroka is a referral center for the Barzilai and Yoseftal hospitals.
Rabin Medical Center – Beilinson Campus (founded in 1938) in Petah Tikva. Among its specialties are open-heart surgery and neurosurgery, as well as heart, liver and kidney transplants.
Rabin Medical Center – Golda Campus (founded in 1942) in Petah Tikva. Among its specialties are total joint replacement, home dialysis, vascular surgery, and hematology research using electromicroscopic techniques.
Lady Davis Hospital (founded in 1967) in Haifa. It is part of the modern Carmel Medical Center. and provides comprehensive healthcare to the heterogeneous inhabitants of Haifa, its suburbs and points north. Among its specialties are its Cardiology, Cardiovascular and Thoracic Surgery Departments, and its Community and Medicine Epidemiology Department
HaEmek Medical Center – (founded in 1930) in Afula. A general hospital which also specializes in the treatment of fertility and reproductive problems.
Meir Hospital (founded in 1960) in Kfar Saba. It is part of the Sapir Medical Center.  It specializes in its treatment of pulmonary diseases and spinal surgery.
Kaplan Medical Center (founded in 1953) in Rehovot. It is known for its expertise in hand surgery.
Yoseftal Medical Center (founded in 1968) in Eilat. It is part of the Yoseftal Medical Center.  It is Israel’s southernmost hospital.

See also
 Health care in Israel

References

External links

 Clalit home page (English)

Health maintenance organizations
Medical and health organizations based in Israel
Histadrut
Organizations established in 1911
1911 establishments in the Ottoman Empire